Acantholimon acerosum is a species of plant in the Plumbaginaceae family that is native from Turkey to Northwest Iran. The species are evergreen and sprout flowers June. Acantholimon acerosum grows in light well drained soil that is gritty and limey.

References

acerosum
Plants described in 1846
Taxa named by Carl Ludwig Willdenow
Flora of Turkey
Flora of Iran
Flora of Iraq
Flora of the Transcaucasus